The Nokia N79 is a Symbian OS v9.3 smartphone and a member of the Nokia Nseries multimedia smartphone family running on S60 3rd Edition Feature Pack 2. It was officially announced by Nokia on 26 August 2008. The N79 is an advanced device with a 5 megapixel camera, dual LED flash, and GPS, with many improvements over the Nokia N78. It retailed for 350 euros upon release in October 2008.

The N79 has a somewhat more vibrant style compared to usual Nseries devices, with a rotated NOKIA logo (this would later appear on the Nokia N97). Nokia advertised the N79's bold-coloured Xpress-on covers which change the software's colour theme to the cover's. It was also slim by Nseries standards and considered to be attractive. Other features include a 2.4-inch display, 369 MHz ARM11 processor, physical keylock switch, FM transmitter and the Navi wheel.

On 14 January 2009, Nokia announced it would ship a sports edition, dubbed the N79 Active, that included a Bluetooth heart rate monitor, an armband and a new version of the Nokia Sports Tracker application.

Features
 Automatically change from portrait to landscape with orientation sensor
 Automatically adjusts display brightness and keypad backlight with ambient light sensor
 Automatically change theme to the color of the battery cover
 Navigate using the NaviWheel
Photos:
 Geotagging of captured pictures, videos and view them on a map
 Organize photos by albums and tags, as well as synchronize with PC
 Upload and share pictures and videos directly to Ovi and other webservices
Music:
 Audio is through standard 3.5 mm jack headphones, built-in 3D stereo speakers, FM transmitter or Bluetooth technology
 Digital music player with support for playlist editing, equalizer and categorized access to your music collection
 Synchronize and manage music with Nokia Music client
 Integrated FM transmitter and FM receiver
 Search, browse and purchase songs online in Nokia Music Store

Maps and Navigation:
 Built-in GPS with A-GPS support and integrated three months navigation license
 Multimedia city guides and navigation services available for purchase. Drive (voice guided car navigation) or Walk (pedestrian guidance for walking routes) modes.
Video:
 Full-screen video playback to view downloaded, streamed or recorded video clips
 Access internet video feeds through Nokia Video Center
 Access YouTube directly from your phone with integrated Flash Lite 3.0
 Transfer videos from compatible PC, using Hi-Speed USB 2.0 [Videos get converted automatically when drag-drop is used]

Specifications

See also 
 Nseries

References 

N79
N-Gage (service) compatible devices
Nokia Nseries